Hacıosman can refer to:

 Hacıosman, Sungurlu
 Hacıosman (Istanbul Metro)